Coloma Convent Girls' School is a Roman Catholic secondary school and sixth form in a semi-rural location in Shirley, on the outskirts of Croydon, South London, England.

History
The school regards its founder as being the Very Reverend Canon Constant Van Crombrugghe, who founded the Congregation of the Daughters of Mary and Joseph in Belgium in 1817. There is a bronze bust of Van Crombrugghe in the Main Hall and a painting of him in their Performing Arts Centre.

The school opened on 2 August 1869, with one pupil. In 1871, property was found in Tavistock Road, Croydon, and named Coloma. The school remained there until its move in 1965 to the present site. At the start of its history, the school's motto was Timpore in Silvam (in time a forest) but after it became an established place of learning it was changed to Laborare est Orare (to work is to pray).

Previously a grammar school, Coloma became a comprehensive school in 1978, and was a grant-maintained school in 1994–1999. In 2000 the school opened a sixth form. From September 2010 until late 2018  The Quest Academy was part of the separate Coloma Trust,  an academy trust that later also included the Archbishop Lanfranc school.

Previously a voluntary aided school administered by Croydon London Borough Council, in November 2022 Coloma Convent Girls' School converted to academy status. The school is now sponsored by SELCAT, but continues to be under the jurisdiction of Roman Catholic Archdiocese of Southwark.

Admissions policy
Girls wanting to attend the school are admitted using a religious observation points system, which is intended to give priority to candidates who are seen as the most devout, and to families who are most active in the church. The school is one of a small group of Catholic comprehensives to have adopted this system, along with the London Oratory School, Cardinal Vaughan Memorial School and the John Fisher School. Prior to the year 2000 most of these schools admitted a percentage of their pupils based on ability, aptitude or through an interview process. The points system is seen by some as a way for these schools to protect the Catholicity of their intake.

The school also selects a number of pupils at 11+ or 16+ for music scholarships.

House System
Each pupil attending the school is a member of a house; each year group contains six houses: St. Barbara's (red) St. Bernadette's (green), Edith's (yellow), St. Margaret's (light blue), St. Theresa's (purple) and St. Winifred's (dark blue). The house a pupil is sorted into will be the same as any other family member who may have attended the school. Inter-house competitions and events take place throughout the year, culminating at the annual summer Sports Day.

Combined Cadet Force
While the school does not have their own Combined Cadet Force (CCF), a few of the girls per year get to attend CCF training at Royal Russell School enabling them to experience the Army or the RAF.

Headteachers
Madame Helene, 1875 - 1892
Madame Elitrude, 1892 - 1919 
Mother Winefride, M.A., 1919 - 1945 
Mother Marie Winefride, M.A., 1945 - 31 Aug 1948 
Interregnum 1 Sept - 31 Dec 1948
Sister Mary Cuthbert, 1 Jan 1949 - Apr 1980
Sister Mary Gabriel, 21 Apr 1980 – 1989 
Miss M Dolan, 1 Jan 1990 – Nov 1994 
Sister Sheila (Acting), 1 Sep 1994 – 31 July 1995 
Mrs M Martin OBE, 1 Aug 1995–2017
Mrs J Johnson, 2017 -31 Aug 2019
Mrs S Collins, 2019– March 2021
Mrs E Englefield, 2021- present

Alumni
 Mwaka Mudenda, presenter 
 Paula Ann Bland, played Claire Scott in Grange Hill
 Mya-Lecia Naylor, actress
 Jenny Shircore, make-up artist

Grammar school
 Marie Angel, artist and illustrator
 Mavis Batey, World War II codebreaker
 Barbara Jones (artist)
 Dame Erica Pienaar, teacher
 Cathy Shipton, actress who played Duffy in Casualty
 Sarah Thomas (actress),

References

External links
School website

Secondary schools in the London Borough of Croydon
Formerly selective schools in the United Kingdom
Catholic points-based admission school
Catholic secondary schools in the Archdiocese of Southwark
Girls' schools in London
Academies in the London Borough of Croydon
Educational institutions established in 1869
1869 establishments in England